Cymothoe zenkeri, or Zenker's glider, is a butterfly in the family Nymphalidae.

Distribution
It is found in Nigeria, Cameroon, the Central African Republic and the Democratic Republic of the Congo. The habitat consists of forests.

References

Butterflies described in 1913
Cymothoe (butterfly)